Inholland University of Applied Sciences is a university of applied sciences with its campuses located in 8 different cities placed throughout the western Netherlands with an education campus in every main city of the Randstad – the country's economic, political and cultural hub. With over 37,000 students from more than 100 countries, the university follows the applied sciences mode of education.

There are two sorts of universities in Dutch higher education: research universities and universities of applied sciences. Research universities are essentially accountable for offering research-oriented programs, while universities of applied sciences offer courses that focus on the practical application of arts and sciences with the main focus on real-life practice and career preparation.

Between 2007 and 2010, the chairman of the Executive Board was Geert Dales. In the period 2010 to December 2014, the position was filled by Doekle Terpstra. He was succeeded on 1 December 2014 by Jet de Ranitz.

Campuses 
Inholland University has campuses in the following cities:

 Alkmaar
 Amsterdam
 Delft
 The Hague
 Diemen
 Dordrecht
 Haarlem
 Rotterdam

2022 Amsterdam campus

The new building of Inholland in Amsterdam on the Zeeburgereiland is set to be presented in September 2022. The new construction of Inholland on Zeeburgereiland is the result of the fact that the location in Diemen has reached the end of its lifespan. But also because the municipality of Amsterdam has indicated that it would like to see Hogeschool Inholland operate in and from the city. The relocation gives the university of applied sciences a recognizable position in the city of Amsterdam and a good profile in the city and region. The study programs from Amsterdam and Diemen will soon come together at one location.

Organization and activities 
Working in the pattern of applied sciences, Inholland University of Applied Sciences has several in-house learning companies where students conduct projects within a particular industry, often on behalf of a company, institution or governmental agency. For example, NEWb and Rookie Entertainment are student-run companies for our music and media students. Here they learn how to produce a radio or TV show, do market research, create a promotional campaign or organise an event. In Delft, Inholland Composites offers Aeronautical Engineering students an opportunity to gain practical and theoretical knowledge on advanced composite materials.

Bachelor's degrees at Inholland University of Applied Sciences demand three or four years of full-time study and require 240 European Credit Transfer and Accumulation System (ECTS) credits. One ECTS credit represents 28 hours of full-time study and the study/workload for one academic year accounts for 60 credits. The Accreditation Organisation of the Netherlands and Flanders (NVAO) approves study programs offered by Dutch universities. All international bachelor's programs offered by Inholland University of Applied Sciences are recognised by NVAO.

Internships

During their studies, all Inholland students are required to do at least one internship (one semester in the third academic year). Internships, or  work placements, can be done in the Netherlands or abroad, and the choice upon the company is generally done by students themselves, but supervised and approved by the university. Specific requirements may vary according to the study programme.

During the internship students are supervised by one university lecturer or coach, and one company employee.

These internships are useful for building a professional network and gaining work experience directly on the field. Inholland is committed to protect its students during the work placements experience by monitoring its development and quality in rapport to the study career.

Faculties 
The degree programs of Inholland University of Applied Sciences are divided into faculties. There are 75 Bachelor's programs provided by Inholland. The international bachelor's programs come under the faculties of Creative Business and Engineering, Design and Computing. Inholland also offers associate degree (AD) programs, managed by Inholland Academy, and master's programs only in Dutch language.

Agri, Food & Life Sciences

Locations: Amsterdam and Delft

Animal and Livestock Farming  - Full-time Bachelor - Delft
Food Commerce and Technology  - Full-time Bachelor - Amsterdam, Delft
Horticulture & Agribusiness  - Full-time Bachelor - Delft
Horticulture & Agribusiness  - Part-time Bachelor - Delft
Landscape and Environment Management  - Full-time Bachelor - Delft
Biology and Medical Laboratory Research  - Full-time Bachelor - Amsterdam
Biotechnology  - Full-time Bachelor - Amsterdam
Chemistry  - Full-time Bachelor- Amsterdam

Business, Finance & Law

Locations: Alkmaar, Diemen, The Hague, Haarlem and Rotterdam  

Accountancy  - Full-time Bachelor  - Alkmaar, Diemen, Rotterdam
Business Studies  - Full-time Bachelor  - Alkmaar, The Hague, Diemen, Haarlem, Rotterdam
Finance & Control: Business Economics  - Full-time Bachelor  - Alkmaar, Diemen, Haarlem, Rotterdam
Integral Safety Science  - Full-time Bachelor  - Rotterdam
Integral Safety Science - Part-time Bachelor - Rotterdam
Law studies - Full-time Bachelor  - Rotterdam
Law studies  - Part-time Bachelor - Rotterdam
Social Legal Services  - Full-time Bachelor  - The Hague, Rotterdam
Social Legal Services  - Part-time Bachelor - The Hague, Rotterdam

Creative Business

Locations: Alkmaar, Diemen, The Hague, Haarlem and Rotterdam  
Business Innovation (EN)  - Full-time Bachelor - Amsterdam/Diemen
Communication  - Full-time Bachelor  - The Hague, Diemen, Rotterdam
Creative Business  - Full-time Bachelor  -The Hague, Haarlem, Rotterdam
Facility management  - Full-time Bachelor  - Diemen
International Creative Business (EN)  - Full-time Bachelor  - The Hague, Haarlem
Leisure & Events Management  - Full-time Bachelor - Diemen
Music  - Full-time Bachelor  - Haarlem
Tourism Management (EN)  - Full-time Bachelor  - Amsterdam/Diemen
Tourism Management  - Full-time Bachelor  - Diemen, Haarlem, Rotterdam

Health, Sport and Welfare

Locations: Alkmaar, Amsterdam, The Hague, Haarlem and Rotterdam

Medical Imaging and Radiotherapeutic Techniques - Dual Bachelor - Haarlem
Medical Imaging and Radiotherapeutic Techniques  - Full-time Bachelor  - Haarlem
Nurse - Dual Bachelor - Alkmaar, Amsterdam
Nurse  - Full-time Bachelor  -. Alkmaar, Amsterdam
Nurse  - Full-time Bachelor  - Alkmaar, Amsterdam
Obstetrics  - Full-time Bachelor  -Amsterdam
Oral health care  - Full-time Bachelor  - Amsterdam
Pedagogy  - Full-time Bachelor  - Amsterdam
Social Work  - Full-time Bachelor - Alkmaar, Amsterdam, The Hague, Haarlem, Rotterdam
Social Work - Part-time Bachelor - Alkmaar, Amsterdam, The Hague, Haarlem, Rotterdam
Sports science - Full-time Bachelor - Haarlem

Education & Innovation

Locations: Alkmaar, The Hague, Haarlem, Rotterdam and Dordrecht  
Teacher Primary Digital (DigiPabo) - Part-time Bachelor - The Hague, Dordrecht
Teacher primary education (Pabo) - Dual Bachelor - Alkmaar, The Hague, Dordrecht, Haarlem, Rotterdam
Teacher primary education (Pabo) - Full-time Bachelor - Alkmaar, The Hague, Dordrecht, Haarlem, Rotterdam
Teacher primary education (Pabo) - Part-time Bachelor - Alkmaar, The Hague, Haarlem

Engineering, Design and Computing

Locations: Alkmaar, Diemen, Delft and Haarlem
Aeronautical Engineering   - Full-time Bachelor - Delft
Architecture  - Full-time Bachelor - Alkmaar, Haarlem
Aviation technology  - Full-time Bachelor - Delft
Business IT & Management  - Full-time Bachelor - Alkmaar, Diemen
Business IT & Management - Part-time Bachelor - Diemen
Civil engineering  - Full-time Bachelor - Alkmaar
Construction Management & Real Estate / Spatial Development - Full-time Bachelor - Haarlem
Electrical engineering  - Full-time Bachelor -Alkmaar
Electrical engineering - Part-time Bachelor - Alkmaar
Informatics  - Full-time Bachelor - Haarlem
Information Technology  - Full-time Bachelor - Haarlem
Mathematical Engineering  - Full-time Bachelor - Amsterdam/Diemen
Mechanical engineering  - Full-time Bachelor - Alkmaar
Mechanical engineering - Part-time Bachelor - Alkmaar
Precision Engineering (main subject Aviation Technology) - Full-time Bachelor - Delft
Technical Business  - Full-time Bachelor - Alkmaar
Technical Business - Part-time Bachelor - Alkmaar
Technical Informatics  - Full-time Bachelor - Alkmaar

International exchanges

Inholland University of Applied Sciences is an ambitious institute that focuses on internationalisation and the development of international and cross-cultural competencies for the future knowledge worker. For Inholland, international mobility is a tool in order to reach that goal. Currently Inholland is actively part of the Erasmus and exchange program.  This allows students to obtain credits at Inholland that count towards their degree at their home institution. It is an excellent way to experience a different education system and to broaden students’ international outlook.

With approximately 190 partner universities in Europe, and few others overseas (Australia, China, South Korea, Argentina, just to name a few), Inholland's students are given the opportunity of studying abroad for one semester in the third year, by maintaining the same tuition fees that in The Netherlands.

Alternatively, students can choose to stay at Inholland and take part in one of many academic minors offered by each study programme.

Each year more than 300 students and 60 teachers take part in the exchanges, and at the same time, Inholland's locations welcome over 200 students from partner universities around the world.

Partner universities differ based on faculty and course.

References

External links
  Official website

Vocational universities in the Netherlands
Education in North Holland
Education in South Holland
Education in Amsterdam
Education in Rotterdam
Education in The Hague
Alkmaar
Delft
Diemen
Dordrecht
Haarlem